Joan Massià i Prats (Barcelona, 22 February 1890 – 11 June 1969) was a Catalan composer and violinist.

His first wife was the pianist and student of d'Indy, Blanche Selva (1884–1942), with whom Massià recorded the Franck violin sonata and other works. After her death he remarried; his second wife was the Spanish pianist María Carbonell (1911–1988). His students included the violinist Gonçal Comellas.

Selected discography as violinist
 Franck violin sonata - with his first wife, Blanche Selva

Own compositions, editions and recordings
 Set Cançons Sobre Poemes de Tomàs Garcés - Seven poems in Catalan.

Recording
 Set Cançons - Songs. Carmen Bustamante accompanied by Manuel García Morante and José Carreras accompanied by David Giménez (piano). With historical recordings by pianist María Carbonell. La Ma De Guido.

References

1890 births
1969 deaths
Composers from Catalonia
20th-century composers
20th-century Spanish musicians